Guillaume de Palerme ("William of Palerne") is a French romance poem, later translated into English where it is also known as William and the Werewolf. The French verse romance was composed , commissioned by Countess Yolande (who is generally identified as Yolande, daughter of Baldwin IV, Count of Hainaut). The prose version of the French romance, printed by N Bonfons, passed through several editions.

The English poem in alliterative verse, commissioned by Humphrey de Bohun, 6th Earl of Hereford, was written  by a poet named William.  A single surviving manuscript of the English version is held at King's College, Cambridge. The Oxford English Dictionary has cited this poem as being the earliest known use of singular they in written English.

Plot

Guillaume, a foundling supposed to be of low degree, is brought up at the court of the emperor of Rome, and loves the emperor's daughter Melior who is promised to a Greek prince. The lovers flee into the woods disguised in bear-skins. Alfonso, who is Guillaume's cousin and a Spanish prince, has been changed into a wolf by his stepmother's enchantments. He provides food and protection for the fugitives, and Guillaume eventually triumphs over Alfonso's father, and wins back from him his kingdom. The benevolent werewolf is disenchanted, and marries Guillaume's sister.

Motifs
The werewolf as used in this story draws on later developments of that legend than such lais as Bisclavret and Melion, where the werewolf status is inherent, although his obeisance to the king, his father, corresponds to the same act in the other stories.  The werewolf's protection of the child probably stems from the anecdote found in both The Seven Sages and Gesta Romanorum. But the werewolf's attack on his wicked stepmother corresponds to that of the werewolf on his false wife in Bisclavret and Melion, and Guillaume plays the same role as the king, protecting the werewolf after the attack.

The love of Guillaume and Melior, though presented as classical courtly love, ends in marriage and children—a deviation from the original formulation of courtly love that grew common in romances of this era.

References

Additional sources

Bunt, Gerrit H.V., William of Palerne, An Electronic Edition.

Further reading
Guillaume de Palerne, ed. Henri Michelant, Paris: Société des anciens textes français, 1876.  
Histoire littéraire de la France, vol. 22, p. 829.
Madden, F. (1832). William of Palerme, Roxburghe Club.
Skeat, Walter W. (1867). Early English Text Society, Extra Series, No. I.
Max Kaluža, Über das Verhältniß des mittelenglischen allitterirenden Gedichtes "William of Palerne" zu seiner französischen Vorlage., diss. Breslau, Englische Studien 4, Heilbronn (1881).

External links
Translators' difficulties
William of Palerne (William and the Werewolf), translated and retold in Modern English prose by Richard Scott-Robinson. 

Medieval poetry
Medieval French romances
Fictional Sicilian people
Werewolf written fiction